The Ukrainian Hockey Extra League was the name of the highest ice hockey league in Ukraine during the 2015–16 season, playing for the Ukrainian Hockey Championship. After only one season, the league was disbanded.

Seasons
 2015–16 (winner: HC Donbass)

References

Defunct ice hockey leagues in Ukraine
Sports leagues established in 2015
Sports leagues disestablished in 2016
2015 establishments in Ukraine
2016 disestablishments in Ukraine